The suspensory ligament of the penis is attached to the pubic symphysis, which holds the penis close to the pubic bone and supports it when erect. The ligament does not directly connect to the corpus cavernosum penis, but may still play a role in erectile dysfunction. The ligament can be surgically lengthened in a procedure known as ligamentolysis, which is a form of penis enlargement.

Gallery

See also 
 Suspensory ligament of clitoris
 fundiform ligament of penis

References

External links 
 The Mayo Clinic -- Penis enlargement: Fulfillment or fallacy?
 

Mammal male reproductive system
Ligaments
Human penis anatomy